Slave Narratives: A Folk History of Slavery in the United States (often referred to as the WPA Slave Narrative Collection) is a collection of histories by formerly enslaved people undertaken by the Federal Writers' Project of the Works Progress Administration from 1936 to 1938. It was the simultaneous effort of state-level branches of FWP in seventeen states, working largely separately from each other. FWP administrators sought to develop a new appreciation for the elements of American life from different backgrounds, including that from the last generation of formerly enslaved individuals. The collections of life histories and materials on African American life that resulted gave impetus to the collection. 

The collection of narratives and photographs, as works of the U.S. federal government, are in the public domain, has been digitized, and is available online. In addition, excerpts have been published by various publishers as printed books or on the Internet. The total collection contains more than 10,000 typed pages, representing more than 2,000 interviews. The Library of Congress also has a digitized collection of audio recordings that were sometimes made during these interviews.

Origins and Inspiration 
After 1916 The Journal of Negro History published articles that in part had to do with the African American experience of slavery (as opposed to the white view of it). This resulted in several efforts to record the remembrances of living former enslaved individuals, especially as the survivors of the generation born into slavery before Emancipation in 1865 were declining in number.

The earliest of these were two projects begun in 1929, one led by Charles S. Johnson at Fisk University and the other by John B. Cade at Southern University, called "Opinions Regarding Slavery - Slave Narratives." In 1934 Lawrence D. Reddick, one of Johnson's students, proposed a federally-funded project to collect narratives from formerly enslaved individuals through the Federal Emergency Relief Administration, which was providing work opportunities for unemployed people as part of the first wave of New Deal funding. This program, however, did not achieve its ambitious goals. Several years passed before narratives began to be collected again.

Although some members of the Federal Writers' Project were aware of Reddick's project, the FWP slave narrative collection was more directly inspired by the collections of folklore undertaken by John Lomax. Carolyn Dillard, director of the Georgia branch of the Writers' Project, pursued the goal of collecting stories from persons in the state who had been born into slavery. A parallel project was started in Florida with Lomax's participation, and the effort subsequently grew to cover all of the southern states (except Louisiana) and several northern states. In the end, Arkansas collected the largest volume of slave narratives of any state.

Controversy surrounding the interviews 
Though the collection preserved hundreds of life stories that would otherwise have been lost, later historians have agreed that, compiled as it was by primarily white interviewers, the collection does not represent an entirely unbiased view. Because the federal government employed mostly white interviewers to document these former enslaved individuals' stories, there is a debate regarding whether these interviews are tainted by racism. John Blassingame, an influential historian of slavery, has said that the collection can present "a simplistic and distorted view of the plantation" that is too positive. Blassingame's argument proved controversial; one historian in the 1990s described support for Blassingame's position as "rare," but defended him on the grounds that "all historical evidence has to be measured against a minimum standard of truth that would allow historians to use it properly. Historians have not, to date, applied this stipulation to the slave narratives". Other historians worried that individuals interviewed may have modified their accounts in other ways because of being interviewed by whites.

Historian Catherine Stewart argues in her book Long Past Slavery: Representing Race in the Federal Writer's Project, that "a way for Anderson, a former slave being who was interviewed by a white man, to comment on race relations in Jim Crow Florida- a means for a black interviewee to make an argument about the unwelcome presence of a white interviewer in her home, and to point out the danger she perceived in his presence, all while perserving a mask of civility and giving the interviewer what he had asked for? While Federal Writer's Project interviewers like Frost were engaged in writing down African American ghost stories", Stewart writes, "former slaves such as Josephine Anderson were conjuring up tales about power and racial identities". Historian Lauren Tilton asserts that "the Ex-Slave Narratives became a site to negotiate black people's right to full citizenship and to be a part of the nation's identity. The subjectivity of the interviewer, the questions posed, responses from the interviewees, and the ways the stories were written shaped the narratives, which became a contested space to assert or de-legitimize black selfhood and therefore rights to full incorporation into the nation."

Project impact 
More recently, even as the narratives have become more widely available through digital means, historians have used them for more narrow, specific kinds of studies. For instance, one historian has examined responses to conflict among the members of the Gullah community of the Low Country, with a view to relating it to traditional African ideas about restorative justice. Another has drawn from them for a history of representations of the black body extending to the present. Another historian has studied them as a window into the time period of their transmission, the 1930s and the Great Depression, rather than the antebellum period they document. Though most of the narratives are preserved only in the notes of the interviewers, large numbers of photographs and 78 rpm audio recordings were made as well. These have proved valuable for such purposes as examining changes in African-American Vernacular English over time. These narratives have also impacted current movements such as the Black Lives Matter Movement beginning in 2013. Clint Smith writes, "The Black Lives Matter movement has further pushed historians to revisit these stories. The past several years—and particularly the months since last summer’s racial-justice protests—have prompted many people to question what we’ve been taught, to see our shared past with new eyes. The FWP narratives afford us the opportunity to understand how slavery shaped this country through the stories of those who survived it".

Publication 
A small group of the narratives first appeared in print in a Writers' Project book, These Are Our Lives. Excerpts from them were included in a Virginia Writers' Project book in 1940, and Benjamin Botkin's Lay My Burden Down in 1945. However, large numbers of the narratives were not published until the 1970s, following the civil rights movement when changing culture  created more widespread interest in early African American history. The influence of New Social History, as well as increased attention to the historical agency of enslaved individuals, led to new interpretations and analysis of slave life. An anthology was published in 1998 that included audio cassettes with excerpts from the collections' recordings. The narratives also served as the basis for the 2003 HBO documentary Unchained Memories: Readings from the Slave Narratives.

Photograph gallery

See also
 Slave narrative

References

External links

 Born in Slavery: Slave Narratives from the Federal Writers' Project, 1936 to 1938 (Library of Congress)

Online versions of collected narratives, by state:

Slave narratives
Federal Writers' Project
1936 establishments in the United States